Rankin & Taylor was a law practice that represented bicyclists in both civil and criminal cases. The firm's founding partners were cyclists.

History 
The firm was founded in 2008 by attorneys David B. Rankin and Mark C. Taylor, who were passionate about bicycling.

Cases
The firm represented Tad Hirsch, creator of the TXTMob messaging service. Protestors used TXTmob to organize events during the 2004 Republican National Convention. When the New York City Law Department subpoenaed Hirsch's TXTmob records, Rankin argued that the subpoena was "vague" and "overbroad." They claimed that disclosing the information about TXTmob users who had nothing to do with lawsuits would violate their First Amendment and privacy rights.

In 2010, the firm represented Said Hajem in a discrimination lawsuit against the NYPD. The firm argued that the NYPD's refusal to hire Hajem, despite his high scores on the police entrance exam was discrimination. 
 
In 2011, the firm represented Sojourner Hardeman in a federal civil rights lawsuit against the NYPD. Hardeman had been arrested numerous times for panhandling on Fifth Avenue.  The firm argued that the arrests for disorderly conduct were without probable cause, and violated Hardeman's constitutional rights. In a judge-approved stipulation, the NYPD agreed not to arrest her without probable cause.

The firm also represented client in police misconduct lawsuits against the NYPD.

Bicycling and freedom of assembly
The firm's attorneys are cyclists and advocates for safer cycling in New York City.<r  Rankin was among the attorneys who represented Critical Mass cyclists in a lawsuit against the New York City, alleging unlawful arrests. In 2010, the lawsuit led to a $965,000 payment from the city to the cyclists.

The firm represented Christopher Long, a bicyclist assaulted by a police officer during a 2008 Critical Mass bicycle ride.  In a 2011 case, the firm's attorneys were among the lawyers who brought a class action suit on behalf of cyclists who had been improperly ticketed for riding outside of the bike lane.

The firm worked with the National Lawyers Guild on mass-defense strategies for Occupy Wall Street protestors at Zuccotti Park. In addition, Taylor challenged the NYPD's use of barricades to pen in protestors. Taylor has served as vice president of the NYC Chapter of the National Lawyers Guild.

Freedom of Information law
The firm has represented clients in Freedom of Information Law litigation, and represented clients seeking information about the closure of Chase Plaza in downtown Manhattan, a formerly public space.  The firm also worked to both unseal the names and records of bodies buried in New York City's Hart Island, and to increase access to the graves.

References

External links
Rankin & Taylor

Law firms based in New York City